California is a 1947 American Western film directed by John Farrow and featuring Ray Milland, Barbara Stanwyck and Barry Fitzgerald. Stanwyck's singing voice was dubbed by Kay St. Germaine.

Plot
Jonathan Trumbo, a deserter who had been an army lieutenant, is hired to guide a wagon train bound for California during the California Gold Rush. When a woman named Lily Bishop is accused of cheating at poker in a saloon, farmer Michael Fabian invites her to join the wagon train over Trumbo's strenuous objections. Trumbo also accuses of her of cheating at cards after losing to Lily, an insult that she promises not to forget.

Lily leaves with Booth Pennock, a ruffian who injures Trumbo with a whip before departing. Lily ends up in Pharaoh City running a saloon. The town is controlled by Pharaoh Coffin, a former slave trader who opposes law and order and California statehood. After Trumbo becomes involved in a saloon brawl, Lily orders him to never return to the saloon, but Trumbo wins the place in a poker game.

Lily mistakenly takes Pharaoh to be an honest man and moves into his hacienda. Coffin's men assault Trumbo, who is rescued on the trail by Mexicans and vows revenge. When his wounds heal, Trumbo returns and becomes a spokesman for statehood advocacy. Coffin's hired men kill Fabian for similar beliefs, causing Lily to finally see Coffin for the crazed villain whom he is. Trumbo forms a posse and corners Coffin, who is descending into madness, and Lily shoots him. Trumbo, in love with Lily, promises to return to the army to atone for his desertion, hoping to someday return to her.

Cast
 Barbara Stanwyck as Lily Bishop
 Ray Milland as Jonathan Trumbo
 Barry Fitzgerald as Michael Fabian
 George Coulouris as Pharaoh Coffin
 Albert Dekker as Pike
 Anthony Quinn as Hernandez
 Frank Faylen as Whitey
 Gavin Muir as Booth Pennock
 James Burke as Pokey
 Eduardo Ciannelli as Padre
 Roman Bohnen as Col. Stuart
 Argentina Brunetti as Elvira
 Howard Freeman as Senator Creel
 Julia Faye as Wagon Woman
 Ethan Laidlaw as Reb (uncredited)
 Ian Wolfe as James K. Polk (uncredited)
 Lester Dorr as Mike, the Dealer (uncredited)

References

External links

 
 
 
 
 

1947 films
1947 Western (genre) films
American Western (genre) films
Films scored by Victor Young
Films directed by John Farrow
Films set in California
Films shot in California
Paramount Pictures films
Films about the California Gold Rush
1940s English-language films
1940s American films